Anolis frenatus, the bridled anole, is a species of lizard in the family Dactyloidae. The species is found in Costa Rica, Panama, and Colombia.

References

Anoles
Reptiles of Costa Rica
Reptiles of Panama
Reptiles of Colombia
Reptiles described in 1899
Taxa named by Edward Drinker Cope